The April 2012 Idlib Governorate Operation was initiated by the Syrian Ba'athist government, in order to make gains against the rebels, prior to the implementation of the U.N. brokered ceasefire, planned for 10 April 2012. The ceasefire was officially announced by the Syrian Ba'athist government and other sides on 14 April 2012.

Background

Binnish throughout the Syrian civil war has been a major protest hub. It had been captured by the FSA. The Syrian Army then later assaulted Idlib city in March 2012 in a major operation. As early as March 23, it was reported Binnish was one of their next targets. Binnish is on a hill, so it is harder to assault. The Syrian Army had agreed to Kofi Annan's peace plan and to withdraw troops by April 10.

April Operation
On April 1, it was reported that the FSA was outgunned, so they were making homemade bombs to defend themselves.

By April 3, the Syrian Army had retaken Sarmin. CNN reported they were assaulting Binnish, Taoum, Sarmin, and Taftanaz with tanks and helicopters.

On April 4, the Syrian Army was still shelling Binnish and Taftanaz. Citizens were reported to be fleeing Binnish, but could not flee Taftanaz because it was surrounded by the Syrian Army. 20 were reported killed in Taftanaz.

On April 5, the Syrian Army announced a pause in fighting in Taftanaz for residents to collect the dead. Imagery released by Ambassador Robert Ford showed that the Army withdrew from Taftanaz after taking it, then took the nearby town of Zardana.

On April 6, the Syrian Army started shelling the village of Killi.

By April 7, it was reported at least 100 had been killed in Taftanaz and Killi.

On April 8, the Syrian Army, with about 90 tanks backed by helicopters, assaulted the al-Rouge plain with the FSA being surrounded and shelled in the village al-Bashiriyah in the plain.

On April 12, Khirbet al-Joz was reported to have been taken by the Syrian Army after two hours of clashes.

On April 13, though, it was reported the FSA still held Khirbet al-Joz and shelling was ongoing.

Aftermath

References

External links 
In Cold Blood, Human Rights Watch, 10 April 2012.
They Burned My Heart, Human Rights Watch, 3 May 2012.

Military operations of the Syrian civil war in 2012
Idlib Governorate in the Syrian civil war
Military operations of the Syrian civil war involving the Syrian government
Military operations of the Syrian civil war involving the Free Syrian Army